Harold C. Sylvester (April 27, 1903 – July 15, 1988) was a Vermont attorney, politician, and judge.  He was most notable for his long service on the Vermont Superior Court, and as an associate justice of the Vermont Supreme Court from 1963 to 1964.

Early life
Harold Charles Sylvester was born in Eden, Vermont on April 27, 1903, the son of Geneva L. (Sullivan) and farmer Leonard I. Sylvester.  He was educated in Eden and Johnson, and graduated from Johnson High School.  Sylvester attended Saint Michael's College for two years, and then began the study of law in the Morisville offices of William E. Tracy and Frederick G. Fleetwood.  Sylvester was admitted to the bar in 1927, and began a practice in St. Albans.

Start of career
A Republican, while practicing in St. Albans, Sylvster served in local office including city attorney and member of the city council.  He served as assistant secretary of the Vermont Senate from 1943 to 1945, and secretary of civil and military affairs (chief assistant) for Governor Mortimer R. Proctor from 1946 to 1947.  In 1948, Sylvester was elected to the Vermont House of Representatives, and he was reelected in 1950 and 1952.  In his second and third terms, Sylvester was chairman of the House Appropriations Committee.

Sylvester served on the board of directors of the Howard Bank and the Swanton Savings Bank and Trust Company.  He was also a member of the board of directors for the St. Albans Hospital.  From 1946 to 1947 he was president of the Vermont Bar Association.

Judicial career
In 1953, Governor Lee E. Emerson appointed Sylvester as a judge of the Vermont Superior Court.  He advanced by seniority to become the court's chief judge in 1959, and he continued to serve until his appointment to the Vermont Supreme Court.

Governor Philip H. Hoff appointed Sylvester as an associate justice of the Vermont Supreme Court in 1963, in keeping with the tradition of naming the senior judges of the superior court to the supreme court as vacancies arose.  Sylvester filled the vacancy caused by the promotion of James Stuart Holden to Chief Justice, and he served as an associate justice until 1964, when he requested return to the superior court, saying that he preferred trial work to appellate work.  Hoff obliged Sylvester by appointing superior court Judge F. Ray Keyser Sr. to the supreme court as Sylvester's replacement, and Sylvester to the superior court vacancy created by Keyser's promotion.

Sylvester remained on the superior court until retiring in 1972.  After leaving the bench, Sylvester practiced law in Burlington until retiring in the early 1980s.

Death and burial
Sylvester died in Burlington on July 15, 1988.  He was buried at Resurrection Park Cemetery in South Burlington.

Family
In 1936, Sylvester married Gertrude Cecile Foy, who was usually called Cecile.  They were the parents of sons Harlan and Alan, and daughter Gail.  Harlan Sylvester pursued a career as a financial services consultant, and has provided economic advice to a succession of Vermont governors beginning with Thomas P. Salmon.  Alan Sylvester became an attorney, and specialized in personal injury, medical malpractice, and product liability lawsuits.  Gail Sylvester became the wife of Edward Cashman, who served as a judge of the Vermont Superior Court from 1982 to 2007.  She pursued a career as an emergency room nurse, and later became a consultant on medical ethics.

References

Sources

Newspapers

Internet

Books

1903 births
1988 deaths
People from St. Albans, Vermont
Republican Party members of the Vermont House of Representatives
Vermont lawyers
U.S. state supreme court judges admitted to the practice of law by reading law
Justices of the Vermont Supreme Court
Burials in Vermont
20th-century American politicians
20th-century American judges
20th-century American lawyers